The 4th Infantry Division (4-ya Pekhotnaya Diviziya) was an infantry formation of the Russian Imperial Army that existed in various formations from 1806 until the end of World War I and the Russian Revolution. When the war broke out in 1914 it was based in Łomża. In June 1917, it was designated as the 4th Infantry Shock Division (4-я пехотная ударная дивизия) upon being reformed as a shock troop unit and the following month it became known as the 4th Infantry Shock Division of Death (4-я пехотная ударная дивизия смерти).

History 
The division was formed in 1806. In 1916, during World War I, the 4th Infantry Division took part in the Brusilov Offensive and was later reorganized as a "death" shock troop unit by General Aleksei Brusilov. It was demobilized around the time of the Russian Revolution and the subsequent unrest.

Organization 
Russian infantry divisions consisted of a staff, two infantry brigades, and one artillery brigade. The 4th Infantry Division was part of the 6th Army Corps as of 1914.
1st Brigade
 13th General Field Marshal Count Lacy's Belozersk Infantry Regiment
 14th His Majesty the King of Serbia's Olonets Infantry Regiment
2nd Brigade 
 15th General Field Marshal Prince Nikita Repnin's Schlüsselburg Infantry Regiment
 16th Ladoga Infantry Regiment
4th Artillery Brigade

Known commanders

Known chiefs of staff

References 

Infantry divisions of the Russian Empire
Military units and formations established in 1806
Military units and formations disestablished in 1918
Łomża Governorate